Campion is an abandoned townsite in the Wheatbelt region of Western Australia, on the Koorda–Bullfinch Road. The closest locality is Chandler and the closest main town is Mukinbudin.

Campion was named after Sir William Campion, the Governor of Western Australia from 1924 to 1931. Nearby Lake Campion was also named in his honour.

The town was established by former soldiers as part of a soldier settlement scheme. A school was built in 1925, and in 1927 a railway siding was constructed. The siding remained in operation until 1957.

The Campion district was the site of the so-called "Great Emu War" of 1932.

References

Ghost Towns Starting With 'C'
Campion, Western Australia

Wheatbelt (Western Australia)
Ghost towns in Western Australia